Coleophora cracella is a moth of the family Coleophoridae. It is found in southern France and Spain and from Slovakia and Hungary to Bulgaria and southern Russia.

The larvae feed on Vicia cracca. They create a large, blackish pistol case, almost entirely covered by a transparent pallium.

References

cracella
Moths described in 1835
Moths of Europe